Hilda Rey was an Argentine actress. She starred in the 1950 film Arroz con leche under director Carlos Schlieper.

Selected filmography
 The Orchid (1951)

References

External links
 
 

Argentine film actresses
20th-century Argentine actresses
Year of birth missing
Year of death missing